Toronto Lady Lynx was a Canadian women's soccer team, founded in 2005. The team was a member of the USL W-League, formerly the second tier of women’s soccer in the United States and Canada. The team played in the Great Lakes Division of the Central Conference against teams from  Laval, London, Ottawa, Quebec City and Waterloo.

The team played its home games at various stadiums around the city of Toronto, Ontario: primarily at Centennial Park Stadium, but also at The Soccer Centre in Vaughan, Ontario as well as Oshawa Civic Auditorium in Oshawa, Ontario. The team's colours were white, gold and black.

The team was a sister organization of the men's Toronto Lynx team, which played in the USL Premier Development League.

Players

Most recent roster
As of 18 June 2011.

Staff
  Danny Stewart Head Coach
  Paul DeAbreu Assistant Coach
  Joe Nucifora Goalkeeper Coach
  Dr. Robert Gringmuth Medical Coordinator
  Dr. Frank Markus Team Doctor
  Dr. Melanie Lopes Medical Assistants

Year-by-year

References

External links 
 
  Toronto lady Lynx on W-League page

 
Ly
Women's soccer clubs in Canada
United Soccer League teams based in Canada
USL W-League (1995–2015) teams
2005 establishments in Ontario
Association football clubs established in 2005

fr:Toronto Lynx Soccer Club